Michael John Keyes (21 March 1886 – 8 September 1959) was an Irish Labour Party politician and trade unionist. 

He was born on 21 March 1886 at 41 Blackboy Pike, Limerick city, the second son of Michael Keyes, caretaker, and his wife Hannah (née White). After being educated by the Christian Brothers at Sexton Street, Limerick, he began work as a clerk on the Waterford–Limerick railway line and subsequently served an apprenticeship in carpentry in the workshop of the Great Southern and Western Railway where he remained until 1927.

He had also joined the National Union of Railwaymen and was chairman of the Limerick shopmens’ branch (1915–1926). In 1918 he was active in the anti-conscription campaign and the following year was appointed a delegate to the Irish Trades Union Congress in Drogheda. He was president of the Irish Trades Union Congress in 1943, and in February 1945 represented it at the World Federation of Trade Unions in London.

He was first elected to Dáil Éireann on his second attempt in 1927 as a Labour Party Teachta Dála (TD) for the Limerick constituency. He lost his seat in the second election in 1927 and failed to be elected at the 1932 general election, however, he returned to the Dáil at the 1933 general election.

During the Spanish Civil War he sided with the Irish Christian Front who supported Franco's Nationalists over the Republicans.

In 1949 he joined the cabinet of John A. Costello replacing the recently deceased Timothy J. Murphy and serving as Minister for Local Government from 1949 to 1951. During the Mother and Child Scheme controversy he urged the government to accept the Catholic Church in Ireland's rebuke of the scheme.

He served in government again between 1954 and 1957, serving as Minister for Posts and Telegraphs. Keyes fought his last election in 1954 and subsequently retired from the Dáil. He also served as Mayor of Limerick from 1928 to 1930, as did his son Christopher P. Keyes from 1957 to 1958 and his grand nephew, Joe Leddin in 2007.

References

1886 births
1959 deaths
Labour Party (Ireland) TDs
Members of the 5th Dáil
Members of the 8th Dáil
Members of the 9th Dáil
Members of the 10th Dáil
Members of the 11th Dáil
Members of the 12th Dáil
Members of the 13th Dáil
Members of the 14th Dáil
Members of the 15th Dáil
Mayors of Limerick (city)
Local councillors in County Limerick